Eballistra lineata is a fungal plant pathogen that causes stem smut in rice.

References 

Fungi described in 1882
Fungal plant pathogens and diseases
Rice diseases
Ustilaginomycotina
Taxa named by Mordecai Cubitt Cooke